The 1974 United States House of Representatives elections in South Carolina were held on November 5, 1974, to select six Representatives for two-year terms from the state of South Carolina.  The primary elections were held on July 16 and the runoff elections were held two weeks later on July 30.  Three incumbents were re-elected, Democrat John Jenrette defeated incumbent Republican Edward Lunn Young in the 6th district and the two open seats in the 3rd and 5th districts were retained by the Democrats.  The composition of the state delegation after the elections was five Democrats and one Republicans.

1st congressional district
Incumbent Democratic Congressman Mendel Jackson Davis of the 1st congressional district, in office since 1971, defeated Republican challenger George B. Rast.

General election results

|-
| 
| colspan=5 |Democratic hold
|-

2nd congressional district
Incumbent Republican Congressman Floyd Spence of the 2nd congressional district, in office since 1971, defeated Democratic challenger Matthew J. Perry.

Democratic primary

General election results

|-
| 
| colspan=5 |Republican hold
|-

3rd congressional district
Incumbent Democratic Congressman William Jennings Bryan Dorn of the 3rd congressional district, in office since 1951, chose to not seek re-election and instead made an unsuccessful run for governor.  Butler Derrick won the Democratic primary and defeated Republican Marshall Parker in the general election.

Democratic primary

General election results

|-
| 
| colspan=5 |Democratic hold
|-

4th congressional district
Incumbent Democratic Congressman James R. Mann of the 4th congressional district, in office since 1969, defeated Republican challenger Robert L. Watkins.

General election results

|-
| 
| colspan=5 |Democratic hold
|-

5th congressional district
Incumbent Democratic Congressman Thomas S. Gettys of the 5th congressional district, in office since 1964, opted to retire.  Kenneth Lamar Holland won the Democratic primary and defeated Republican B. Len Phillips in the general election.

Democratic primary

General election results

|-
| 
| colspan=5 |Democratic hold
|-

6th congressional district
Incumbent Republican Congressman Edward Lunn Young of the 6th congressional district, in office since 1973, was defeated in his bid for re-election by Democrat John Jenrette.

General election results

|-
| 
| colspan=5 |Democratic gain from Republican
|-

See also
United States House elections, 1974
United States Senate election in South Carolina, 1974
South Carolina's congressional districts

References

South Carolina
1974
1974 South Carolina elections